Hovhannes XII Arsharuni (Istanbul, 1854 – Istanbul, 21 January 1929) was an Armenian Patriarch of Constantinople.

Born in Constantinople, Hovhannes Arsharuni attended the Galatasaray High School. He taught at the local Armenian schools and was ordained as a cleric of the Armenian church in 1879. He was ordained archbishop in 1899. He became Patriarch of Constantinople in 1911 and was forced to resign in 1913.

He died on January 21, 1929, and is buried at the Şişli Armenian Cemetery.

References 

1854 births
1929 deaths
Armenian Patriarchs of Constantinople
Armenian Oriental Orthodox Christians
Armenians from the Ottoman Empire
Galatasaray High School alumni
19th-century Oriental Orthodox archbishops
20th-century Oriental Orthodox archbishops
Burials at Şişli Armenian Cemetery